During the Parade of Nations at the 2022 Commonwealth Games opening ceremony, held on 28 July 2022, athletes bearing the flags of their respective nations lead their national delegations as they paraded into Alexander Stadium in the host city of Birmingham, England. A total of 72 Commonwealth Games Associations entered into the stadium.

Parade order
As per tradition, Australia (as the host of the last games) entered first, followed by the rest of the Oceania region. Following this all countries entered in alphabetical order within their respective region groups. After Oceania, countries from Africa, America, Asia, the Caribbean and lastly Europe entered. The host nation, England, entered last.

Countries and flag bearers
Below is a list of parading countries and their announced flag bearer, in the same order as the parade. Names are given in the form officially designated by the CGF.

References

Parade of Nations
Parades in England